Alwyn Jones (born 28 February 1985) is an Australian triple jumper.

Jones was born in Australia. He attended Victoria University.

He finished fifth at the 2004 World Junior Championships, won the bronze medal at the 2006 Commonwealth Games and finished eighth at the 2006 World Cup. Jones is also a nine-time national champion.

His personal best is 16.83 metres, achieved when he won the 2009 Australian Championships in Brisbane.

References

1985 births
Living people
Australian male triple jumpers
World Athletics Championships athletes for Australia
Commonwealth Games medallists in athletics
Commonwealth Games bronze medallists for Australia
Athletes (track and field) at the 2006 Commonwealth Games
Australian Athletics Championships winners
21st-century Australian people
Medallists at the 2006 Commonwealth Games